France women's national goalball team is the women's national team of France.  Goalball is a team sport designed specifically for athletes with a vision impairment.  The team takes part in international competitions.

Paralympic Games

2024 Paris 

The team may be competing in the 2024 Summer Paralympics, from Wednesday 28 August to Sunday 8 September 2024, in the Stade Pierre de Coubertin, Paris, France.  As the host nation, they receive one of the eight slots.

World Championships  

IBSA World Goalball Championships have been held every four years from 1978.  Placing first or second in the tournament may earn a berth in the Paralympic Games goalball tournaments.

2022 Matosinhos 

The team competed in the 2022 World Championships from 7 to 16 December 2022, at the Centro de Desportos e Congressos de Matosinhos, Portugal.  There were sixteen men's and sixteen women's teams.  They placed sixth in Pool A, and twelfth in final standings.

Regional championships 

The team competes in the IBSA Europe goalball region.  Groups A and C are held one year, and Group B the following year.  Strong teams move towards Group A.

2016 Porto (Group B) 

The team competed in the 2016 IBSA Goalball European Regional Championships Group B, from 4 to 8 October 2016 at Maia municipality, Porto, Portugal.  There were ten men's teams and nine women's teams.  

There were nine women's teams: Belgium, France, Germany, Great Britain, Greece, Hungary, Netherlands, Portugal, Spain.  

The team came seventh, ahead of Hungary and Portugal.

2021 Samsun (Group A) 

The team competed in the 2021 IBSA Goalball European Championships (Group A), from Friday 5 to 12 November 2021, in the Yaşar Doğu Sport Hall, Samsun, Turkey.  Women's teams included: Denmark, Finland, France, Germany, Great Britain, Greece, Israel, Turkey. 

The team came fourth of the five women's teams in Group D, and came fifth in the overall standings.

See also 

 Parasports 
 France men's national goalball team 
 France at the Paralympics

References 

France women's national goalball team
France women's national goalball team
National women's goalball teams
Goalball in Europe